Robert Pierpoint (8 June 1845 – 22 January 1932) was Member of Parliament for Warrington from 1892 to 1906.

Pierpoint was educated at Eton College and Christ Church, Oxford where he obtained his MA in 1871. He was then called to the bar at the Inner Temple and became a Justice of the Peace.

He married at the old Church of the Annunciation, Bryanston street on 17 December 1902 Marie Eugénie, widow of John Wills.

References

1845 births
1932 deaths
Conservative Party (UK) MPs for English constituencies
UK MPs 1892–1895
UK MPs 1895–1900
UK MPs 1900–1906
People educated at Eton College
Alumni of Christ Church, Oxford